Farhod Tadjiyev (Uzbek Cyrillic: Фарход Тожиев or Farhod Tojiyev; born 9 April 1986) is an Uzbekistani footballer who plays as a striker who plays for FC Dinamo Samarqand. His name means happiness in Persian. He is the younger brother of Kamoliddin Tajiev and Zaynitdin Tadjiyev.

Club career
He joined Tianjin Teda in February 2010, after Tianjin Teda released his elder brother Zaynitdin Tadjiyev. In 2011–12 he played in Pakhtakor Tashkent. In summer 2012 he moved to Shurtan Guzar.

On 27 January 2013 he signed a contract with Lokomotiv Tashkent. In 2013, he scored 17 goals in 13 first League matches, leading goalscorer list far ahead. After injury he could not play any match in the season. Tadjiyev scored 13 goals in 2014 League for Lokomotiv and became one of the League goalscorers. He was the best Lokomotiv goalscorer in 2013–14 seasons.

He signed a contract with Malaysian T-Team on 24 November 2014. On 28 February 2015 in Malaysia FA Cup Round of 32 match against ATM Tadjiev scored two goals in the 101st and 113rd minutes in a 3–0 victory.

On 28 September 2016, Farhod signed for Machine Sazi F.C. to begin a new chapter in his career in Iran's Persian Gulf Pro League.

International career
Tadjiyev made five appearances for the Uzbekistan national football team in the 2010 FIFA World Cup qualifying rounds.

He was called to Uzbekistan team to play in the 2014 FIFA World Cup qualification match against Lebanon on 26 March 2013.

Farhod's hat-trick against Qatar in the 2014 FIFA World Cup Qualification added to his popularity among Uzbek football fans and gained him much recognition on Asia's international stage.

Career statistics

Goals for Senior National Team

Honours

Club
Pakhtakor
 Uzbek League (1): 2007
 Uzbek League runner-up (2): 2008, 2009
 Uzbek Cup (2): 2009, 2011
 CIS Cup (1): 2007

Tianjin Teda
 Chinese Super League runner-up (1): 2010

Lokomotiv
 Uzbek League runner-up (2): 2013, 2014
 Uzbek Cup (1): 2014

Individual
 Lokomotiv best goalscorer: 2013, 2014

References

External links

 

Living people
1986 births
Uzbekistani footballers
Uzbekistani Muslims
Uzbekistan international footballers
Uzbekistani expatriate footballers
Pakhtakor Tashkent FK players
FC Taraz players
Tianjin Jinmen Tiger F.C. players
Chinese Super League players
Expatriate footballers in China
Uzbekistani expatriate sportspeople in China
Machine Sazi F.C. players
Association football forwards